< List of placenames in the Province of Pomerania < List of towns in Vorpommern

The List of towns in Western Pomerania includes all towns in present-day German Pomerania, and thus excludes towns which lie west of the Oder river, but east of the Oder-Neisse line (Stettiner Zipfel area), and thus historically are associated also with Western Pomerania. For these towns, see List of towns in Farther Pomerania.

German Western Pomerania had a population of about 470,000 in 2012 (districts of Vorpommern-Rügen and Vorpommern-Greifswald combined) - while the Polish districts of the region had a population of about 520,000 in 2012 (cities of Stettin, Swinemünde and Police County combined). So overall, about 1 million people live in the historical region of Western Pomerania today, while the Stettin agglomeration reaches even further.

For a list of all urban municipalities in the modern German state, see List of cities in Mecklenburg-Vorpommern.

Pomerania
Vorp
 Vorpommern
 Vorpommern